Erythrae or Erythrai was a town of the Ozolian Locrians, probably the harbour of Eupalium.

The site of Erythrae is tentatively identified with the modern site of Monastiraki.

References

Populated places in Ozolian Locris
Former populated places in Greece